Alpha-cleavage (α-cleavage) in organic chemistry refers to the act of breaking the carbon-carbon bond adjacent to the carbon bearing a specified functional group.

Mass spectrometry 
Generally this topic is discussed when covering tandem mass spectrometry fragmentation and occurs generally by the same mechanisms.

For example, of a mechanism of alpha-cleavage, an electron is knocked off an atom (usually by electron collision) to form a radical cation. Electron removal generally happens in the following order:  1) lone pair electrons, 2) pi bond electrons, 3) sigma bond electrons.

One of the lone pair electrons moves down to form a pi bond with an electron from an adjacent (alpha) bond.  The other electron from the bond moves to an adjacent atom (not one adjacent to the lone pair atom) creating a radical. This creates a double bond adjacent to the lone pair atom (oxygen is a good example) and breaks/cleaves the bond from which the two electrons were removed.

In molecules containing carbonyl groups, alpha-cleavage often competes with McLafferty rearrangement.

Photochemistry 
In photochemistry, it is the homolytic cleavage of a bond adjacent to a specified group.

See also 
 Inductive cleavage

References 

Organic reactions
Tandem mass spectrometry